Jordi Alsina i Bilbeny (born 14 October 1961) is a Spanish historian from Catalonia best known for his theory that Christopher Columbus was a Catalan.

Bilbeny has a degree in Catalan Philology by the Autonomous University of Barcelona and has been a professor of Catalan language classes for adults at the Islamic Cultural Council of Catalonia and at the Women's Penitentiary of Barcelona (Wad-Ras), among other places. He launched the "Symposium on the Catalan discovery of America" in 2001. Bilbeny is a member of the "Arenysian Movement for Self-Determination", a local independentist movement, and of the Arenys de Munt's Popular Unity Candidacy, and was one of the organizers of the 2009 Catalan independence referendum in Arenys de Munt, for which he composed the anthem. He is a leading member of the Institut Nova Història, a research organisation which claims that Columbus, Miguel de Cervantes, and the author of Lazarillo de Tormes were Catalan.

References

1961 births
Living people
Writers from Catalonia
Catalan nationalists
Autonomous University of Barcelona alumni
Spanish conspiracy theorists
Pseudohistorians
Teachers of Catalan